Thedgonia is a genus of fungi in the family Drepanopezizaceae of the order Helotiales.
They have been recorded in most places in Europe including Great Britain.

They affect plants such as Ligustrum vulgare and species of Verbascum, forming spots on the leaves.

Species
As accepted by Species Fungorum;
 Thedgonia bellocensis 
 Thedgonia dioscoreae 
 Thedgonia ligustrina 
 Thedgonia lupini 
 Thedgonia pavoniae 
 Thedgonia pulvinata

References

External links
 

Helotiales